The Six Days of Stuttgart was a six-day track cycling race held annually in Stuttgart, Germany.

Winners

References

Cycle races in Germany
Six-day races
Recurring sporting events established in 1928
Recurring sporting events disestablished in 2008
1928 establishments in Germany
2008 disestablishments in Germany
Defunct cycling races in Germany
Sports competitions in Stuttgart